Susie Schmitt Hanson (August 13, 1860–October 7, 1956) was a milliner, dressmaker and entrepreneur from Minnesota. As the owner of one of Waconia's longest-running businesses, she remains a prominent figure in the history of that town.

Susan "Susie" Schmitt was born on August 13, 1860 in the village of Chaska. She was one of eight children of John and Rosina Schmitt. The others were Andrew, Casper, Anna, Caroline, Bernice, and twins Joseph and Josephine.

Schmitt was a talented seamstress from a young age. She turned that gift into a career spanning nearly seven decades, working on quilts, dresses, hats, hat pins, and more. Susie Schmitt first entered the millinery (hat making) business in 1888 as an apprentice for four years in the city of St. Paul. Afterward, she returned to Chaska to run a dressmaking business. That business operated for twelve years.

In 1898, Schmitt opened her own dressmaking and millinery shop in Waconia. Four years later, she moved the shop to a prime location on Main Street after purchasing the A. Ed. Kauder property for $2,300. At this new location, the store focused on millinery. Schmitt operated the business for forty-eight years, until she sold it to Mrs. Elva Ellison in 1946. She continued making and remodeling hats in a smaller shop. Schmitt also maintained scrapbooks of newspaper clippings of weddings, obituaries and key events, which are now in the Carver County Historical Society collection along with many of her photographs and examples of her work as a milliner.

In July, 1912, Susie Schmitt married Charles Hanson, a local carpenter born in March 1861. The couple never had children of their own, leaving Schmitt to care for and spoil her nieces and nephews. After Hanson died on June 16, 1932, Schmitt outlived him by twenty-four years, until her own death on October 7, 1956 at the age of ninety-six.

Notes

References
"Miss Susie Schmitt Married." Waconia Patriot, July 5, 1912.
"Mrs. Hansen a Milliner 40 Years." Waconia Patriot, July 12, 1928.
"Mrs. Hansen Sells Millinery Store." Waconia Patriot, June 13, 1946.
"Purchase Property." Weekly Valley Herald, January 29, 1903.
"Waconia's Oldest Citizen Died Sunday." Waconia Patriot, October 11, 1956.

Further reading
Ben-Yusuf, Anna. The Art of Millinery: A Complete Series of Practical Lessons for the Artiste and the Amateur. New York: Millinery Trade Publishing Co., 1909.
Powell, Vee Walker. How to Make Hats and Accessories. Garden City, NY: Garden City Publishing Co., 1946.
Schilling, Trish Carney. Millinery Preservation : Storage, Display, Tools, Steam, Felt, Straw, Fabric, Trims, Repairs-Hat Bodies, Repairs-Wires & Headsize Chart. Minneapolis: Minneapolis Millinery, 1999.

1860 births
1956 deaths
American milliners
People from Chaska, Minnesota
American tailors
People from Waconia, Minnesota
Businesspeople from Minnesota